Mark Berry is a New Zealand lawyer who was the chair of the Commerce Commission of New Zealand between April 2009 and May 2019.

Berry was a partner in law firm Bell Gully (then called Bell Gully Buddle Weir) from 1988 until he resigned to do post-graduate studies at the Columbia Law School where he gained a JSD.  He taught Contract Law, Competition Law and Securities Regulation at University of Otago Faculty of Law.

He was Deputy Chair of the Commerce Commission from 1999 to 2001. He was a consultant with Chapman Tripp until 2003. From 2003, Berry practised as a barrister sole at Barristers.Comm chambers.

References

Year of birth missing (living people)
Living people
Columbia Law School alumni
20th-century New Zealand lawyers
Academic staff of the University of Otago
21st-century New Zealand lawyers